The Jean-Pierre Graff Trophy is an award in the Ligue Magnus, the top professional ice hockey league in France, given to the most promising player in the league. The Trophy was first awarded in 1981 and has been presented ever year except 1989, when there was no recipient.

Winners

External links
 Ligue Magnus trophies 

Ligue Magnus
Awards established in 1981
Ice hockey trophies and awards
French ice hockey trophies and awards
Rookie player awards